Altınüzüm is a  town in Islahiye district of Gaziantep Province, Turkey. The population of Altınüzüm was 5150  as of 2012. The name of the town means "Golden grapes" and it refers to the best known product of the town. Pekmez which is a concentrated syrup made of grapes is also popular.

References

Populated places in Gaziantep Province
Towns in Turkey
İslahiye District